Clivina californica is a species of ground beetle in the subfamily Scaritinae. It was described by Van Dyke in 1925.

References

californica
Beetles described in 1925